This is a list of individuals and events related to Armenia in 2021.

Incumbents
President: Armen Sarkissian
Prime Minister: Nikol Pashinyan
Speaker: Ararat Mirzoyan (until 2 August), Alen Simonyan (from 2 August)

Events

Ongoing
 COVID-19 pandemic in Armenia

January 

 18 January – Russian Foreign Minister Sergey Lavrov says that Armenia has returned all Azeri prisoners who were captured during the 2020 Nagorno-Karabakh war.

 20 January – The Ministry of Health says that Armenia plans to buy COVID-19 vaccines from AstraZeneca for 3% of the country's population.
22 January – The Armenian parliament installs Gagik Jahangirian and Davit Khachaturian in the Supreme Judicial Council, after being nominated to fill two vacant seats by the My Step Alliance.

February 
 25 February – Prime Minister Nikol Pashinyan warns of an attempted military coup against him after the army demands that he and his government resign.

March 
 5 March – Armenia forcedly to withdraw from the Eurovision Song Contest 2021 due to lack of attention of Athena Manoukian to participate.

April 
 24 April – US President Joe Biden officially recognized the Armenian genocide.
 25 April – Nikol Pashinyan announced his formal resignation to allow snap elections to be held in June, although he remained as acting prime minister in the leadup to the elections.

June 
 20 June – 2021 Armenian parliamentary election: Acting PM Nikol Pashinyan wins the country's snap election, with his Civil Contract party gaining 54% of the vote.

July 
 23 July-8 August – 17 athletes from Armenia competed at the 2020 Summer Olympics in Tokyo, Japan

September 
 21 September – Armenia celebrated its 30th anniversary of independence from the Soviet Union.

December 
 19 December – Maléna wins the Junior Eurovision Song Contest 2021 with the song "Qami Qami".

Predicted and scheduled events 
 2022 FIFA World Cup qualification – UEFA Group J
 25 March – 2022 FIFA World Cup qualifiers:  Liechtenstein v. Armenia
 28 March – 2022 FIFA World Cup qualifiers: Armenia v. Iceland
 31 March – 2022 FIFA World Cup qualifiers: Armenia v. Romania
 2 September – 2022 FIFA World Cup qualifiers: North Macedonia v. Armenia
 5 September – 2022 FIFA World Cup qualifiers: Germany v. Armenia
 8 September – 2022 FIFA World Cup qualifiers: Armenia v. Liechtenstein
 8 October – 2022 FIFA World Cup qualifiers: Iceland v. Armenia
 11 October – 2022 FIFA World Cup qualifiers: Romania v. Armenia
 11 November – 2022 FIFA World Cup qualifiers: Armenia v. North Macedonia
 14 November – 2022 FIFA World Cup qualifiers: Armenia v. Germany

Deaths 
 31 March – Arkady Ter-Tadevosyan, military leader (b. 1939)
 6 July – Djivan Gasparyan, musician and composer (b. 1928)
 29 September – Hayko, singer and songwriter (b. 1973)

See also
 Outline of Armenia
 Index of Armenia-related articles
 List of Armenia-related topics
 History of Armenia

References

Notes

Citations
 

 
2020s in Armenia
Years of the 21st century in Armenia
Armenia
Armenia
Armenia